Jan Krasiński (1756–1790) was a Polish nobleman (szlachcic).

Jan became starost of Opiniogóra in 1774 and Rotmistrz of National cavalry. His grandson Zygmunt Krasiński, became one of Poland's greatest romantic poets.

1756 births
1790 deaths
Jan Krasinski